Show Your Love is the third studio album by Taiwanese singer Jolin Tsai. It was released on December 22, 2000, by Universal and D Sound. Produced by David Wu, Peter Lee, Paul Lee, Chen Wei, and Jae Chong, it features a wide range of musical styles and her maturer musical performance.

It was well received by music critics, who commented that it was relatively rich in music styles in the true sense during her Universal period, with a fairly balanced ratio of ballads and dance songs. The album sold more than 280,000 copies in Taiwan. The music video of "Fall in Love with a Street" won an MTV Video Music Award for International Viewers' Choice.

Background and development 
On April 26, 2000, Tsai released her second studio album, Don't Stop, which sold more than 500,000 copies in Taiwan, becoming the year's second highest-selling album by a female artist and the year's sixth highest-selling album overall in the country. On July 11, 2000, Tsai went to Juilliard School in New York City to attend a two-month vocal course. On November 24, 2000, it was revealed that Tsai had finished recording her new album. On December 7, 2000, it was revealed that her new album would be released on December 22, 2000.

Writing and recording 
"Show Your Love" is a lively party song that features eight black backing vocalists, whose born vocal rhythm is the icing on the cake. "Do You Still Love Me" is lyrical and melodious, and its lyrics describe girls' expectation for love and delicate emotion of being afraid of being hurt.

"Fall in Love with a Street" was inspired by New York City's streets,and the lyrics describe girls' expectation and aspiration for love. "Reluctant" sounds beautifully, and its lyrics describe the inner emotion of girls. The lyrics of "Feel Your Presence" describe girls' view of love and the mood transition of looking forward to love.

Release and promotion 
The album's standard edition contains 10 new songs and a short documentary film named Jolin's True Life. Since January 13, 2001, Tsai held 28 signing sessions across Taiwan. On February 9, 2001, Universal released the celebration edition of the album. On February 25, 2001, Tsai held the Show Your Love Concert in Panchiao, Taiwan. On March 4, 2001, Tsai held the second Show Your Love Concert in Taichung, Taiwan. On March 16, 2001, Universal released the memorial edition of the album, which additionally includes two music videos and three live videos. The album reached number 11 on the 2001 year-end album sales chart of Rose Records in Taiwan.

Live performances 
On December 31, 2000, Tsai participated in the New Year's Eve Concert in Taipei, Taiwan, where she performed "Show Your Love", "Reluctant", "Fall in Love with a Street", "Baby Face", and "Do You Still Love Me". On March 22, 2001, she participated in the recording of Fuji TV's television show Asia Super Live in Tokyo, Japan, where she performed "Show Your Love", and it was broadcast on Fuji TV on March 27, 2001. On June 9, 2001, she attended an event held by MTV Mandarin in Taipei, Taiwan and performed "Show Your Love" and "Surprise". On August 25, 2001, she attended a party for MTV Video Music Awards and performed "Fall in Love with a Street". Since then, Tsai has been performing songs from the album at various events.

Singles and music videos 
On December 12, 2000, the music video of "Show Your Love" was premiered on websites including Kimo, PChome, Yam, Yahoo!, Sina, etc. At the same time, it was also broadcast in 70 City Chain stores in Taiwan, the 100-inch LED screen on a number of advertising vehicles in northern Taiwan, 10 Mobitai Communications stores in central Taiwan, and the outdoor screen of Hanshin Department Store in Kaohsiung. It was directed by Tony Lin and features 14 dancers, presenting a lively music party atmosphere. On December 13, 2000, Tsai released the single, "Show Your Love".

The music video of "Do You Still Love Me" was directed by Kuang Sheng and features Taiwanese actor Ming Dao. It was filmed at a desolate grassland, presenting a vast sense of space. The music video of "Fall in Love with a Street" was directed by Ma Yi-chung, and it was inspired by Tsai's real life in the United States. Tsai said: "I like walking on the streets in the United States very much, because I can walk without pressure and easily. That feeling is the biggest enjoyment of being a singer." It also features the scenes of Tsai dancing with others as well as being alone, Tsai said: "Only when you were alone in a foreign country, you can really feel the warmth of home. When I was in the United States, I really miss everything in Taiwan."

Both music videos of "Reluctant" and "Feel your Presence" were also directed by Ma Yi-chung. "Do You Still Love Me" reached number 30 on the Hit FM Top 100 Singles of the Year chart of 2001.

Critical reception 
Writing for Southern Metropolis Daily, Deng Ting commented: "Her personal style is clearly defined in the album, the songs are full of emotion that she focused on exuding. Fans can fully absorb her youthfulness and emotion from every song. Of course, her youthfulness determined that she couldn't have any deeper life experience, after listening to the album, it let people feel first love is good, but actually reality is more important, I wonder if with the growth of age in the future, the depth of her performance could be grew further?"

Tencent Entertainment's Shuwa commented: "Show Your Love is the beginning of Jolin Tsai's bold experiment. The label became more open to this album, in terms of musical styles, they are no longer careful and conservative. It can be said that this is Jolin Tsai's album with relatively rich in music styles in the true sense. Some of the tracks, such as "Show Your Love" and "Love Is Near", began to fade her innocence from early years. Of course, the highlight of the whole album is the perfect vocal harmony of eight black backing vocalists in "Show Your Love", which is also Tsai's first-time collaborative work with Korean producer Jae Chong."

Accolades 
On May 18, 2001, Tsai won an MTV Mandarin Award for Top 10 Singers. On September 6, 2001, the music video of "Fall in Love with a Street" won an MTV Video Music Award for International Viewers' Choice.

Track listing

Release history

References

External links 
 
 

2000 albums
Jolin Tsai albums
Universal Music Taiwan albums